Fabricio Fernández Pertusso (born April 9, 1993) is a Uruguayan professional footballer who plays as a midfielder for Macará.

Career
Fernández began his career in 2013 with Rocha.

On 28 January 2019, Australian club Mt Druitt Town Rangers FC announced on their official Facebook account, that they had signed Fernández. He returned to Uruguay in January 2020, signing with C.A. Progreso.

Personal life
Fernández is the older brother of fellow footballer Joaquín Fernández.

References

1993 births
Living people
Uruguayan footballers
Uruguayan expatriate footballers
Rocha F.C. players
Club Atlético River Plate (Montevideo) players
F.C.V. Dender E.H. players
Club Nacional de Football players
Miramar Misiones players
C.A. Progreso players
Uruguayan Primera División players
Uruguayan Segunda División players
Association football midfielders
People from Rocha, Uruguay
Uruguayan expatriate sportspeople in Belgium
Uruguayan expatriate sportspeople in Australia
Expatriate footballers in Belgium
Expatriate soccer players in Australia
C.S.D. Macará footballers
Ecuadorian Serie A players
Expatriate footballers in Ecuador
Uruguayan expatriate sportspeople in Ecuador